was one of 10 s built for the Imperial Japanese Navy during World War I. While operating in the Aegean Sea, Sakaki was torpedoed by an Austro-Hungarian U-boat in 1917.

Design and description
The Kaba-class destroyers were improved versions of the preceding . The Kabas were powered by three vertical triple-expansion steam engines, each driving one shaft using steam produced by four Kampon water-tube boilers. Two boilers burned a mixture of coal and fuel oil while the other pair only used oil. Their crew consisted of 92 officers and ratings.

The main armament of the Kaba-class ships consisted of single quick-firing (QF)  guns located on the bows. They were also armed with four QF  guns on single mounts. Two guns were positioned abreast the middle funnel, one gun was on the aft superstructure and the fourth gun was on the stern. The destroyers' torpedo armament consisted of two twin rotating mounts for  torpedoes located between the superstructure and the stern gun.

Construction and career 

Sakaki was launched on 15 February 1915 at the Sasebo Naval Arsenal and completed on 26 March. During World War I the ship patrolled the area around Singapore and later served as a convoy escort in the Mediterranean Sea.

While part of the Imperial Japanese 2nd Special Squadron helping Allies patrol in the Mediterranean Sakaki was torpedoed by the Austro-Hungarian submarine  on 11 June 1917 in the Aegean Sea between Greece and Crete with the loss of 68 of her 92 ratings, including her commander. She was salvaged and repaired. The Japanese Naval Memorial at Kalkara Naval Cemetery in Malta commemorates the casualties of the attack. Sakaki was stricken from the navy list in November 1931, decommissioned on 1 April 1932 and subsequently broken up.

Notes

References

Bibliography 

 

Kaba-class destroyers
World War I destroyers of Japan
Ships built by Sasebo Naval Arsenal
Japan–Malta relations
1915 ships